Burning of the Valleys may refer to:

The 1780 Burning of the Valleys campaign, part of the American Revolutionary War
Several events during the Valley Campaigns of 1864, part of the American Civil War
The burning of Chambersburg, Pennsylvania
The burning of the Shenandoah Valley
The Burning Raid in the Loudoun Valley